Ziegenfuss is a German surnamethat means "goat foot". Alternative spellings include Ziegenfus, Zickafoose, Zickefoose, Zeigenfuse, Sickafaus, Sickafus, Sigafoes, Sickafoose, etc. Notable people with the surnames include:

Ziegenfuss
 George Ziegenfuss (1917–2007), American basketball player and coach
 Oma Ziegenfuss, pseudonym of Georg Schäfer (1926–1990), German painter, poet, and author who lived in Guatemala and the United States
 Valerie Ziegenfuss (born 1949), American tennis player

Alternative spellings
 Todd Sickafoose (born 1974), American musical artist
 Julie Zickefoose (born 1958), American biologist and nature book writer

References 

German-language surnames